Schilder's disease may refer to two different diseases described by Paul Schilder:

 Adrenoleukodystrophy
 Diffuse myelinoclastic sclerosis